The Miami Heat is an American professional basketball team based in Miami. They play in the Southeast Division of the Eastern Conference in the National Basketball Association (NBA). The team joined the NBA in 1988 as an expansion team with the Charlotte Hornets, and won its first NBA championship in 2006. The team played its home games at the Miami Arena until 2000, and have played its home games at the American Airlines Arena since then. The Heat is owned by Micky Arison.

There have been six head coaches for the Heat franchise. The franchise's first head coach was Ron Rothstein, who served for three seasons with the Heat. Pat Riley, having coached the Heat for eleven seasons in two stints, is the franchise's all-time leader for the most regular-season games coached (849), the most regular-season game wins (454), the most playoff games coached (50), and the most playoff-game wins (26); Erik Spoelstra is the franchise's all-time leader for the highest winning percentage in the regular season (.707) and total wins (607). Spoelstra is the only Heat head coach to have spent his entire NBA coaching career with the Heat, and has been the head coach of the Heat since 2008.

Key

Coaches 

Notes
 A running total of the number of coaches of the Heat. Thus, any coach who has two or more separate terms as head coach is only counted once.
 Each year is linked to an article about that particular NBA season.

References
General

Specific

Lists of National Basketball Association head coaches by team

Head coaches